
Gmina Słaboszów is a rural gmina (administrative district) in Miechów County, Lesser Poland Voivodeship, in southern Poland.

Villages
Gmina Słaboszów contains the villages and settlements of Buszków, Dziaduszyce, Grzymałów, Ilkowice, Janowice, Jazdowice, Kalina Wielka, Kropidło, Maciejów, Nieszków, Raszówek, Rędziny Zbigalskie, Rędziny-Borek, Rzemiędzice, Słaboszów, Śladów, Słupów, Święcice, Wymysłów and Zagorzany.

Neighbouring gminas
Gmina Słaboszów is bordered by the gminas of Działoszyce, Książ Wielki, Miechów and Racławice.

References
Polish official population figures 2006

Slaboszow
Miechów County